The Mexican Mafia (Spanish: Mafia Mexicana), also known as La eMe (Spanish for "the M"), is a Mexican American criminal organization in the United States. Despite its name, the Mexican Mafia did not originate in Mexico, and is entirely a U.S. criminal prison organization. Law enforcement officials report that the Mexican Mafia is the deadliest and most powerful gang within the California prison system. 

Government officials state that there are currently 400–500 official members of the Mexican Mafia  with thousands of hitmen and associates within prison and an estimate of more than 50,000 foot soldiers who also carry out its illegal activities on the streets in the hopes of becoming full members. The Mexican Mafia appears to have  immense reach and influence into every Hispanic street gang in Southern California, including the notoriously brutal MS-13 and 18th Street Gang who are under the Mexican Mafia's control. The U.S. Government considers the Mexican Mafia to be "among the most powerful, dangerous and feared criminal organizations in the world", and even considers La Eme to be more dangerous and at least as powerful as any Mexican drug cartel.

Culture
Law enforcement believes that La eMe presently is not presided over by a single leader. Many Mexican Mafia members have the authority to order murders and oversee various other criminal activities. They have almost a thousand associates that help carry out those orders and have the theoretical control of all Sureño gang members. Members are expected to engage in tests of their loyalty to La Eme, which may include theft or murder. The penalty for refusing orders or failing to complete an assigned task is often death. According to the gang's constitution, members may also be punished or murdered if they commit any of four major infractions. These include becoming an informant, acts of homosexuality, acts of cowardice, and showing disrespect against fellow gang members. According to gang policy, a member of the Mexican Mafia may not be murdered without prior approval by a vote of three members, yet the murder of non-members requires no formal approval.

During the early 1960s at San Quentin Prison, Luis "Huero Buff" Flores and Rudy "Cheyenne" Cadena established a blood oath for members of the Mexican Mafia. Prior to the establishment of the oath, members of the Mexican Mafia were allowed to return to their street gangs after incarceration. The new oath stipulated that the only way for a member to leave the Mexican Mafia was to be killed. Flores and Cadena also established a set of gang commandments. These included policies such as: a new member must be sponsored by an existing member, unanimous approval from all existing members to join (no longer policy), prioritizing the gang over one's family, denial of the existence of the Mexican Mafia to law enforcement or non-members, respect of other members, and forgiving street conflicts which existed before incarceration. Execution of a member of the gang for policy violation must be committed by the gang member who sponsored him. La Eme has a blood-in, blood-out Murder or drawing of blood is a prerequisite for membership and anyone trying to get out will be killed.

Rules
The rules of conduct are:

 A member may not be an informant.
 A member may not be a coward.
 A member may not raise a hand against another member without approval from the higher-ups and leaders.
 A member must not show disrespect for any member's family, including sex with another member's wife, or girlfriend.
 A member must not steal from another member.
 A member may not be homosexual, sex offender, child killer, child molester, or rapist.
 A member must not politic against another member or cause dissension within the organization.
 Membership is for life, the only way out is death.
 Retaliation must be carried out if anyone crosses La eMe, no exceptions.
 Vendetta must be carried out, even if it takes months, years, or decades.
 If a member of La eMe gets harmed or killed by someone else such as police, or another criminal gang, retaliation must be immediate, and must be swift, brutal and deadly.
 It's mandatory to assault/kill all dropouts and traitors.
 La eMe comes first. Even before your own family, religion and god.
 A member must not interfere with another member's business activities.
 A member must never harm children.
 A member must always treat another member's family with respect and kindness.
 A member must protect another member from harm.
 A member must treat another member like a brother.

Allies and rivals
The Mexican Mafia is the controlling organization for almost every Hispanic gang in Southern California, and some gangs located in Central and Northern California, with their vassal gangs being called Sureños. Members of almost all Hispanic gangs in Southern California are obliged under the threat of death to carry out any and all orders from made Mexican Mafia members. The Mexican Mafia also holds a loose alliance with the Aryan Brotherhood, mainly due to their common rivals within the prison system.

The primary rivals of the Mexican Mafia are Nuestra Familia. The Mexican Mafia is also a rival of the Black Guerrilla Family prison gang, which holds a loose alliance with La Nuestra Familia. Bloods and Crips are the new enemies.From 2010 to 2011, The Mexican Mafia and Los Zetas engaged in a bloody and brutal war against each other over turf and drug territories, and conflict between both organizations staggered on with tit-for-tat retaliations and murders, and there were many drive-by shootings, bombings, assassinations, kidnappings, and shoot outs against each other. In mid-2011, both sides agreed to end the war and make peace.

Symbols
Mexican Mafia symbols include images of a black hand. The gang's primary symbol, which is often used in tattoos by members, is the national symbol of Mexico (eagle and a snake) atop a flaming circle over crossed knives. Street gangs that are aligned with the Mexican Mafia often use the number 13 as a gang identifier, as the letter "M" is the 13th letter of the modern Latin-derived alphabet.

Criminal activities
According to the Federal Bureau of Investigation, the Mexican Mafia had arranged for contract killings to be carried out by the Aryan Brotherhood, a white prison gang. The Mexican Mafia and the Aryan Brotherhood are mutual enemies of the Norteños and the African-American gangs Black Guerrilla Family and D.C. Blacks. Even though homosexuals are barred from entry into La eMe, they are engaged heavily in homosexual prostitution in the prison system. Many of the street level homicides in the Highland Park area of Los Angeles committed by the Avenues gang were done on orders issued by the Mexican Mafia.

The Mexican Mafia is involved in a variety of criminal activities both inside and outside the prison system, but its main source of income is extorting drug distributors outside prison and distributing various narcotics within and outside the prison system. In 1992, an example of La Eme'''s influence and power over Sureños was made clear to law enforcement. Joe "Pegleg" Morgan, a prominent Mexican Mafia leader, ordered that no more drive-by shootings and violence were to take place by Sureños. Between April, when the edict was announced, and September 1992 there were no drive-by shootings in East Los Angeles, an area that was notorious for violence and drive-bys.

1970s
The first murder outside of prison that was ordered by La eMe occurred in 1971 when Mexican Mafia members Alfonso "Pachie" Alvarez and Mark "Markitos" Odowd were found shot twice in the head in a secluded area of Monterey Park. His offense: collecting taxes on narcotics dealers without kicking up the profits to eMe leaders behind bars, known in the gang as "Big Homies" or Emeros. The person responsible for the murder was Joe "Pegleg" Morgan—the notorious white godfather of La Eme who had ascended by then to become one of the highest-ranking bosses of the entire organization, even with no "official" Mexican blood himself.  His connections with cocaine and heroin suppliers in Mexico helped pave the foundation for the Mexican Mafia's narcotics distribution throughout California. During the 1970s, while under the control of Morgan's protégé Rodolfo Cadena, the Mexican Mafia often took control over various community groups. The gang was able to filter money from alcohol and drug prevention programs to finance their criminal activities.

The Mexican Mafia and the Italian-American Los Angeles crime family collaborated in skimming money from Get Going, a taxpayer-funded drug treatment program. By 1977, Get Going founder Ellen Delia was determined to expose the infiltration of her beloved program. Shortly before an appointment with the California State Secretary of Health and Welfare Services, Delia was murdered. Her collection of evidence on Italian and Mexican Mafia infiltration of the Get Going program was never recovered.

1980s
Alfred Arthur Sandoval a.k.a. Chato (Arizona Maravilla – East Los Angeles, California), a high ranking eMe member, shot and killed Gilbert Martinez and Anthony Aceves; a third victim Manuel Torres survived the attack. Ray and Marlene Wells were also shot execution style in their home in Belvedere Park. Alfred Sandoval was also charged in these murders. Finally in 2000, Alfred Arthur Sandoval, the highest ranking Eme member (now) in California, had his death sentence for the murder of Marlene Wells overturned by the federal 9th Circuit Court of Appeals but remained imprisoned for life without parole.

1990s
In 1998, United States federal authorities indicted 22 members and associates of the Mexican Mafia, charged under the federal Racketeer Influenced and Corrupt Organizations Act with crimes which included extortion, murder, and kidnapping. One of the arrested members, Benjamin "Topo" Peters (Arizona Maravilla), was allegedly the Mexican Mafia's highest-ranking member at the time, and was engaged in a power struggle with fellow member Ruben "Tupi" Hernandez (Onterio Varrio Sur – Ontario, California). Another indicted member was accused of having plotted the death of an anti-gang activist who served as a consultant for the film American Me. The indictments marked a two-year investigation by federal, local, and state law enforcement officials.

2000s
In 2006, a 36-count federal indictment was brought against members of the Mexican Mafia. The arrests were made for alleged acts of violence, drug dealing, and extortion against smaller Latino street gangs. According to the federal indictment, Mexican Mafia members exert their influence in both federal and state prison systems through either violence or the threat of violence. Members and associates of the gang remain fiercely loyal to the criminal organization both in and outside of prison, particularly in Southern California cities such as Los Angeles and San Diego. The gang asserts its influence over Chicano gangs throughout Southern California by threatening violence against their members should they ever become incarcerated. Gangs and drug dealers who refuse to pay a protection "tax" to the Mexican Mafia are often murdered or threatened with murder. High-ranking members of the Mexican Mafia who are locked in private cells for 23 hours of each day are still able to communicate with their associates, through methods which range from tapping in code on prison plumbing pipes to smuggled letters. The primary goal of the Mexican Mafia is to control all drug trafficking in all areas that they have been established.

2010s
In early 2012 there was a federal indictment of 119 San Diego County gang members, including a Mexican Mafia boss that was arrested in a raid of his San Marcos home, which portrays a sprawling, well-organized criminal network that ran drug dealing on the streets of North County and even extended inside the Vista jail. Rudy "Crazy" Espudo (Esco Varrio Diablos – Escondido, California) was in control of the Hispanic gangs in the area and forced drug dealers to pay taxes in tribute to La eMe or face the consequences. The local gangs were smuggling narcotics into the Vista Detention Center in order to sell them for the Mexican Mafia. On North County streets, la Eme ordered Surenos to obtain taxes from the local drug dealers. Members of the Azusa 13 gang, associated with the Mexican Mafia, were indicted in 2011 for harassing and intimidating black people in Southern California.

2020s
In January 2022, a fight broke out between members of the Mexican Mafia and MS-13 at Beaumont federal prison, causing two fatalities and leading to all US federal prisons being placed on lockdown due to fears of retaliatory attacks.

In popular culture
The Mexican Mafia received mainstream notoriety after being featured in the 1992 movie American Me. The film was co-produced, directed and starred in by actor Edward James Olmos, who allegedly received death threats by members of the Mexican Mafia for what they considered an unflattering depiction of the gang.  Two consultants for the film were murdered shortly after the film's release, though it is unclear whether the murders were tied to the Mexican Mafia or to recent layoffs that had provoked death threats. The Mexican Mafia was allegedly displeased with the portrayal of the murder of Rodolfo Cadena (who was the basis for Olmos' character Santana) as being committed by his fellow gang members. Mexican Mafia members were also allegedly offended by the portrayal of a homosexual rape committed by Puppet, a Mexican Mafia character in the film who in the latter part of the movie murders his own brother, Li'l Puppet, for disrespecting La Eme. Olmos subsequently applied for a concealed handgun permit, which was denied.
While serving a life sentence for murder at Pelican Bay State Prison, Joe "Pegleg" Morgan, filed a $500,000 lawsuit against Olmos, Universal Studios, and other producers of the film.  Morgan claimed that one of the principal characters in the film was based on him without obtaining his permission.

The 1993 film Blood In Blood Out'' is loosely based on the Mexican Mafia, although the story is fictional. The character Miklo Velka is largely based on Joe "Pegleg" Morgan, having lost his leg from getting shot during a robbery (one of the rumored ways that Morgan lost his).  The prison gangs named in the film are in turn inspired by real-life counterparts: La Onda (Mexican Mafia), Black Guerilla Army (Black Guerilla Family), and Aryan Vanguard (Aryan Brotherhood).

See also

 Hermanos de Pistoleros Latinos
 Mexikanemi
 Texas Syndicate

References

External links
 Federal Bureau of Investigation file on the Mexican Mafia
 Mexican Mafia on the History Channel

 
Organizations established in 1957
1957 establishments in California
Hispanic-American gangs
Prison gangs in the United States
Gangs in California
Gangs in Los Angeles
Gangs in San Diego
Mexican-American culture in California